Glendon James Rusch (born November 7, 1974) is a left-handed former Major League Baseball pitcher. He played for the Kansas City Royals, New York Mets, Milwaukee Brewers, Chicago Cubs, San Diego Padres and Colorado Rockies.

Early life
Rusch played baseball at Shorecrest High School in Seattle, Washington. As a senior, he had a 0.79 earned run average and struck out 134 batters while walking 15. He committed to play college baseball for the Washington Huskies. Rusch was selected out of high school by the Kansas City Royals in the 17th round of the 1993 MLB draft and chose to sign.

Baseball career
Rusch made his major league debut in 1997. Near the end of the 1999 season, he was traded to the New York Mets, and in 2002 he was traded along with Lenny Harris to the Milwaukee Brewers for four players, including Jeromy Burnitz in a three-team deal that also involved the Colorado Rockies.

In 2002, Rusch tied for the National League in losses with 16. In 2004, he signed with the Chicago Cubs and had arguably his finest year as he recorded a career-low 3.47 ERA and 1.23 WHIP and had a 6–2 record, the first winning record of his career.

On January 25, 2007, the Cubs released the left-hander. He had one year left on his contract.

On October 31, 2007, Rusch announced that he was officially a free agent and would attempt a comeback for the  season. He threw a bullpen session for interested teams on November 2 and on December 14, signed a minor league contract with the San Diego Padres. On March 26, 2008, the Padres purchased his contract and added him to the major league roster. On May 15, Rusch turned down an assignment to Triple-A, and became a free agent.

On May 16, 2008, he signed a minor league contract with the Colorado Rockies. On May 31, the Rockies purchased his contract and added him to the active roster.

On January 14, 2009, Rusch signed a one-year, $750,000 minor-league deal. He made the team out of spring training.  On May 15, Rusch was designated for assignment.

Coaching career

On January, 2015, Rusch was named pitching coach for the San Diego Padres Class A – Advanced team Lake Elsinore Storm, of the California League.

References

External links

1974 births
Living people
Baseball players from Washington (state)
Major League Baseball pitchers
Omaha Royals players
Indianapolis Indians players
Iowa Cubs players
Kansas City Royals players
New York Mets players
Milwaukee Brewers players
Chicago Cubs players
San Diego Padres players
Colorado Springs Sky Sox players
Colorado Rockies players
Rockford Royals players
Gulf Coast Royals players
Wilmington Blue Rocks players
Omaha Golden Spikes players